The Ricoh GR was a series of point-and-shoot, or compact, 35 mm film cameras made by Ricoh. The chronological list of these cameras are the GR1, GR10, GR1s, GR1v and GR21. The GR name was also used for Ricoh's GR series of digital cameras.

The cameras had a very high quality 1:2.8 28 mm lens. Exposure control could be program automatic or aperture priority semi-automatic. They had a built-in flash and date imprinting versions were also available.

Ricoh GR film cameras

 GR1
 Audience: professional
 Year of release: 1996
 Lens: 28 mm f/2.8
 Weight: 175g
It received the 1997 TIPA award for best 35 mm Compact Camera.

 GR1s
 Audience: professional
 Year of release: 1997
 Lens: 28 mm f/2.8
 Weight: 175g
 Changes: GR1s and GR1v have improved optical coatings for better flare resistance.
 GR1s DATE
 Audience: professional
 Lens: 28 mm f/2.8
 Weight: 175g
 Date imprinting
 GR1v
 Audience: professional
 Year of release: 2001
 Lens: 28 mm f/2.8
 Weight: 175g
 Changes: GR1v has multiple SNAP distances and manual ISO selection. GR1s and GR1v have improved optical coatings for better flare resistance.

Japanese street photographer Daido Moriyama is known to have used the GR1v.

British conflict photographer Philip Jones Griffiths owned and used a GR1.

 GR1v DATE
 Audience: professional
 Lens: 28 mm f/2.8
 Weight: 175g
 Date imprinting
 GR21
 Audience: professional
 Year of release: 2001
 Lens: 21mm f/3.5 (9 elements in 6 groups)
 Weight: 200g
 GR10
 Audience: consumer
 Year of release: 1998
 Lens: 28 mm F/2.8 (7 elements in 4 groups)
 Weight: 170g
 Date imprinting

References

External links
 Ricoh Global Site

Ricoh cameras
Photography equipment